The Official Table of Drops, formerly issued by the British Home Office, is a manual which is used to calculate the appropriate length of rope for long drop hangings.

Following a series of failed hangings, including those of John Babbacombe Lee, a committee chaired by Henry Bruce, 1st Baron Aberdare was formed in 1886 to discover and report on the most effective manner of hanging. In practice, however, the hangmen ignored this table and used considerably longer drops. A significantly revised edition of the Table of Drops was published in October 1913, allowing  of drop energy – and then from 1939 executioners routinely added  nine more inches to the drop in the 1913 Table. 

The Table continued to be used in the United Kingdom until the country suspended capital punishment in 1965, and the UK abolished the death penalty altogether in 1998. 

The Table remains in use in former British colonies that have retained capital punishment by hanging, such as Singapore.

Other published drop tables
 1947 US "Procedure for Military Executions" handbook.

References

External links
The Aberdare Committee
Report of the Aberdare Committee
The evolution of long drop hanging 19th century
The evolution of long drop hanging 20th century
The Table of Drops: The Science of the Noose

Capital punishment in the United Kingdom
Execution equipment